Patigi Emirate is Nigeria traditional state founded 1898 by Idrissu Gana I the first monarch of the emirate, the name patigi means ' small hill ' the emirate situated in pategi local government of kwara State and the capital of Pategi.

The Kingdom 
The emirate was founded by Idrssu Gana who, in 1898, led a group (Kede), a subgroup of the Nupe extract from Bida in the conquest by the Colony empire and the emirate is inhabited by the Nupe people and linguistic dialect of Yoruba, most of the people there are farmer trader and fishermen.

The emirate are entire Nupe speaking people and it host a boating festival known as Pategi Regatta Festival performed mostly at the terrain of Niger River in the Patigi Beach. The boat fest was historical and significant tourism said by Professor Idrissu Aliyu it was founded by traditional council of the emirate in 1949 by two councils leader, Ahman Pategi and Etsu Umaru Bologi I it was first started in 1952 also features the part of people living in the bank of the river in Niger Kwara and Niger Kogi. The festival which consists of boat or canoe racing includes display in Niger Gbaradogi in the river bank west, the emirate also features in the Nupe Cultural Day which is performed yearly in July and mark as the history of the entire Nupe conquest against the british colony.

List of rulers 
The title king in pategi is known as Etsu of Patigi. The present Etsu of Patigi is Alhaji Umar Bologi II.
List of the traditional rulers of the Patigi emirate known as Etsu Patigi founded in 16th century:
 Etsu Idrissu Gana dan Muazu Isa I (b. 1856 - d. 1900). 1898 - 1900
 Muazu Isa dan Idrissu Gana (b. 1882 - d. 1923). November 1900 - 1923
 Usman Tsadi dan Muazu Isa (d. 1931) 1923 -January 1931
 Umaru dan Muazu Isa (b. 1898 - d. 1949) January 1931 - 1949
 Umaru Ibrahim Bologi 1st term (b.1939 - 2018) 1949 - 1966
 Idrissu Gana II (b. 1933 - d. 2005) 26 October 1966 - 2005
Haliru Ibrahim Bologi Chatta II (b. 1958 - 2019) 1999 - 2019
 Umar Bologi II (born 1982) 2018 present.

Notes 

Nigerian traditional states
1898 establishments in Africa
Nupe
Kwara State
Emirates